Ancourt is a commune in the Seine-Maritime department in the Normandy region in northern France.

Geography

Population

Places of interest
 The church of St. Saturnin, dating from the sixteenth century.
 The chateau of Pont-Trancard.

See also
Communes of the Seine-Maritime department

References

External links

Ancourt on the Quid website 

Communes of Seine-Maritime